Dorcadion carinatum is a species of beetle in the family Cerambycidae. It was described by Peter Simon Pallas in 1771, originally under the genus Cerambyx. It is known from Russia, Azerbaijan, Kazakhstan, Georgia, and Ukraine.

Subspecies
 Dorcadion carinatum carinatum (Pallas, 1771)
 Dorcadion carinatum cylindraceum Reitter, 1886
 Dorcadion carinatum igrenum Danilevsky, 1998
 Dorcadion carinatum sunzhenum Danilevsky, 1998
 Dorcadion carinatum uralense Danilevsky, 1998

See also 
Dorcadion

References

carinatum
Beetles described in 1771
Taxa named by Peter Simon Pallas